The 2015 City of Lincoln Council election took place on 7 May 2015 to elect members of City of Lincoln Council in England. This was on the same day as other local elections.

Overall results
The Labour Party retained its majority on the council, but lost one seat, leaving them with 26 seats to the Conservative Party's 7.

|}
All comparisons in vote share are to the corresponding 2011 election.

Ward results

Abbey

Birchwood

Boultham

Bracebridge

Note: This Bracebridge ward seat had been won by the Conservatives the last time it was contested in 2011, but was gained by Labour in a by-election in 2013.

Carholme

Castle

Glebe

Hartsholme

Minster

Moorland

Park

References

2015 English local elections
May 2015 events in the United Kingdom
2015
2010s in Lincolnshire